Irabot is an Indian male given name, especially popular among the Meitei people. Notable people with the given name include:

 Hijam Irabot (1896–1951), Indian politician and activist
 Kshetri Irabot Singh (born 1938), Indian politician

Indian masculine given names